Telephones - main lines in use:
110,300 (2007)
country comparison to the world: 137

Telephones - mobile cellular:
1,895 million (2007)
country comparison to the world: 114

Telephone system:
general assessment:
inadequate; fixed-line network characterized by aging, deteriorating equipment with fixed-line teledensity stuck at 1 per 100 persons; mobile-cellular telephone subscribership is increasing
domestic:
system of open-wire, microwave radio relay, and cellular connections; multiple mobile-cellular providers
international:
country code - 229; landing point for the SAT-3/WASC fiber-optic submarine cable that provides connectivity to Europe and Asia; satellite earth stations - 7 (Intelsat-Atlantic Ocean) (2007)

Radio broadcast stations:
AM 1, FM 34, shortwave 1 (2007)

Radios:
620,000 (1997)

Television broadcast stations:
6 (2007)

Televisions:
60,000 (1997)

Internet Hosts:
848 (2008)
country comparison to the world: 157

Internet Users:
150,000 (2007)
country comparison to the world: 137

Country codes: .bj

See also
Benin

References

External links
GSM World page on Benin
PanAfriL10n page on Benin